Henry Slay (born April 28, 1975) is a former American football defensive lineman. He played three games for the Philadelphia Eagles, before continuing his professional career in other leagues. Slay played college football at West Virginia.

References 

1975 births
Living people
American football defensive tackles
West Virginia Mountaineers football players
Philadelphia Eagles players
Players of American football from Ohio
Berlin Thunder players
New Jersey Red Dogs players
New York/New Jersey Hitmen players